Jalam is a 2016 Malayalam-language movie directed by M. Padmakumar starring Priyanka Nair in the lead role. This is a world's first charity movie, a CSR film by Aries Group directed by M. Padmakumar and produced by Sohan Roy. Multiple songs from the movie are now in contention for nominations in the Original Song Category for the 88th Academy Awards. ‘Bhoomiyilenganumundo’, ‘Kooduvaykkam’, ‘Yaathra Manoradhamerum’ and ‘Pakalppathichari’ are the songs from Jalam that are competing for the nomination in the category. The movie also vies for nominations in the Best Picture Category at the Oscars. The dubbed version of the movie was released in Tamil as Kaanal Neer on September 13

Cast
 Priyanka Nair
 Jain Syriac
 Sethulakshmi
 Prakash Bare
 Ponnamma Babu
 P Balachandran
 Hareesh Peradi

References

External links 
 

2016 films
2010s Malayalam-language films
Films directed by M. Padmakumar
Films scored by Ouseppachan